Stefano Luongo (born 5 January 1990) is an Italian water polo player. He competed in the 2020 Summer Olympics.

References

1990 births
Living people
People from Chiavari
Water polo players at the 2020 Summer Olympics
Italian male water polo players
Olympic water polo players of Italy
Sportspeople from the Province of Genoa
21st-century Italian people